Pehuenche (or Pewenche, people of the "pehuen" or "pewen" in Mapudungun) are an indigenous people of South America.  They live in the Andes, primarily in present-day south central Chile and adjacent Argentina. Their name derives from their dependence for food on the seeds of the pehuen or monkey-puzzle tree (Araucaria araucana). In the 16th century, the Pehuenche lived in the mountainous territory from approximately 34 degrees to 40 degrees south. Later they became Araucanized and partially merged with the Mapuche peoples. In the 21st century, they still retain some of their ancestral lands.

Pehuenche groups participated in various armed conflicts in the 17th and 18th centuries, usually by "descending" from the mountains to the western lowlands of Chile. As such they attacked the Spanish around Maule River in 1657, the Mapuche in January 1767, and the Spanish of Isla del Laja on late 1769. In the 1860s amidst the Chilean invasion of Araucanía the Pehuenche declared themselves neutral. The Pehuenche chief Pichiñán is reported to have spoken against the Moluches, who wanted war, claiming that they engaged in robbery and received for that just punishments by Chileans. Historian José Bengoa claims Pehuenche neutrality was indebted to the fact that their lands in the Andes were not subject to colonization. However the encroaching Argentine and Chilean advances was such that in March 1881 Pehuenches assaulted the Argentine outpost of Chos Malal killing the whole garrison of 25–30 soldiers.

Culture
A Spanish writer first described the Pehuenche in 1558:

That writer did not mention the primary food source of the Pehuenche: the harvest of the seeds of the monkey-puzzle tree (Araucaria araucana), locally called Pehuen.

The Pehuenche adopted horse meat into their diet after feral horses of Spanish origin reached the eastern foothills of the Andes. These herds had developed in the humid pampa, after the Spanish abandoned Buenos Aires the second time in 1541. At first, the Pehuenche hunted horses as any other game, but later they began to raise horses for meat and transport. To preserve horse meat, they sun-dried it to make charqui ("jerky").

Juan Ignacio Molina wrote in his Civic History of the Kingdom of Chile (1787) that the language and religion of the Pehuenche were similar to those of other Mapuche, but he described their dress as distinct. The men wore skirts rather than trousers, as well as earrings and mantillas. Molina described them as nomadic ("vagabond" in his words) and the most industrious and laborious among "all the savages".

See also
 Galletué Lake

References

Bibliography

Mapuche groups
Indigenous peoples in Argentina
Indigenous peoples in Chile
Pre-Columbian cultures